John Myles-Mills (born April 19, 1966) is a retired Ghanaian athlete who competed in the 100 and 200 metres. He represented Ghana at the Olympics in 1988 and 1992, being the country's flagbearer on both occasions. He also ran in the national relay team at both the 1987 and 1991 World Championships in Athletics. His teammates included Eric Akogyiram, Salaam Gariba and Emmanuel Tuffour, as well as Nelson Boateng on the Olympic team.

His younger brother Leonard Myles-Mills was also a sprint athlete.

International competitions

References

External links

Alumni of the Accra Academy
1966 births
Living people
Ghanaian male sprinters
Olympic athletes of Ghana
Athletes (track and field) at the 1988 Summer Olympics
Athletes (track and field) at the 1992 Summer Olympics
World Athletics Championships athletes for Ghana
World Athletics Indoor Championships medalists
African Games silver medalists for Ghana
African Games medalists in athletics (track and field)
Athletes (track and field) at the 1987 All-Africa Games